Woody Ace Norman (born 12 March 2009) is an English actor. He is best known for his role as Jesse in the film C'mon C'mon (2021), for which he received a BAFTA nomination for Best Supporting Actor. He appeared on the Evening Standard list of Londoners to watch in 2022.

On television, he appeared in the Starz adaptation of The White Princess (2017), the BBC and Netflix miniseries Troy: Fall of a City (2018), and series 5 of Poldark (2019).

Early life
Norman is from North London. He is the son of acclaimed former television director Ross Norman, and former girl group Madasun member Vonda Barnes.

Filmography

Film

Television

Awards and nominations

References

External links
 

Living people
English male child actors
Male actors from London
2009 births